Bogomil (Cyrillic: Богомил) was a 10th-century Bulgarian priest who was connected with the origins of Bogomilism. Bogomil is a Theophoric name consisting of Bog (God) and mil (dear). He was declared a heresiarch by both the Catholic and Orthodox churches.

According to Cosmas the Priest, Bogomil first began to preach his beliefs in Bulgaria during the reign of Peter I of Bulgaria (927 to 969), which indicates that Cosmas must have been writing later than 969. As with Cosmas, the life of Bogomil is shrouded in mystery and what little we know of him comes from the sermons written against him. There is some uncertainty about his relationship to Jeremiah or whether they are the same person.  The statement that Jeremiah was "a son (disciple) of Bogomil" may be an interpolation. His name is mentioned in the Book of Boril.

Bogomil Cove on Rugged Island in the South Shetland Islands, Antarctica is named after Bogomil.

References

10th-century Bulgarian writers
Anti-natalists
Bogomilism
Bulgarian priests
Bulgarian male writers